Qiyama or Qiyamah is an Arabic term that means "resurrection". It may also refer to:

Al-Qiyama, the 75th sura (chapter) of the Qur'an
Qiyamah, the Islamic concept of Judgment Day
Qiyāma (Nizārī Ismāʿīlī doctrine), eschatological teaching in Nizārī Ismāʿīlīsm.

See also
 Qayamat (disambiguation)